Tepes may refer to:

People
 Sofija Tepes (born 1973), Chilean table tennis player
 Tepeš (surname), Slovene surname
 Țepeș (surname), Romanian surname

In fiction
 Krul Tepes, character in the Owari no Seraph anime & manga
 Mina Tepes, main character in the Dance in the Vampire Bund manga
 PNS Tepes, starship in the Honorverse series of books by David Weber

Places
 Țepeș Vodă (disambiguation), several villages in Romania
 Vlad Ţepes, one of five villages comprising Comana, Giurgiu, Romania

See also